Thakarpada is a village in the Palghar district of Maharashtra, India. It is located in the Talasari taluka. It lies close to the National Highway 8; the nearest railway station is in Sanjan, Gujarat.

Demographics 

According to the 2011 census of India, Thakarpada has 218 households. The effective literacy rate (i.e. the literacy rate of population excluding children aged 6 and below) is 55.85%.

References 

Villages in Talasari taluka